The Election Publications Act 2001 is an act of the Parliament of the United Kingdom. The act effectively revoked statutory instruments which brought the Political Parties, Elections and Referendums Act 2000 into force, after Labour, the Conservatives and the Liberal Democrats had all made election material which did not comply with the law.

Background
Section 110 of the Representation of the People Act 1983 required all election publications to bear the name and the address of the printer and publisher. Candidates and election agents who did not comply would be committing illegal practice under electoral law and be liable of a fine of up to £5000. The Political Parties, Elections and Referendums Act 2000 changed this so that material also had to carry the names and addresses of the promoter (including election agents) and the person on whose behalf the material was published. The Political Parties, Elections and Referendums Act 2000 (Commencement No. 1 and Transitional Provisions) Order 2001 put these changes into effect.

In March 2001, the Guardian reported that millions of leaflets printed by the Conservatives and the Liberal Democrats would have to be pulped after they were printed without being changed to accommodate the new law. The Election Publications Act 2001 reversed the introduction of the new rules, so meaning parties were still able to use material complying with previous election rules.

Provisions
The provisions of the act are:

The reversal of the commencement of parts of the Political Parties, Elections and Referendums Act 2000 which changed electoral publication law.
That during the period between the commencement and the passing of this Act, it would be deemed that the prior election rules (under the Representation of the People Act 1983) were still in place.

Timetable

Through the Lords

The bill had its first reading in the Lords on 27 March 2001.

Through the Commons and royal assent

The bill was presented to the House for its first reading on 2 April 2001 and its second reading on 4 April, but with little time for debate or scrutiny. The government was criticised by several MPs, including Ann Widdecombe, for the hasty preparation of the bill and the limited time available to debate it when it was made a guillotine motion. Widdecombe said it was "flawed" and had been "cobbled together in ... a matter of hours". Ian Paisley was also critical when the bill made reference to the non-existent Elections (Northern Ireland) Act 2001. The bill gained royal assent on 10 April 2001 and commenced immediately.

Legacy and amendments
The section of the Political Parties, Elections and Referendums Act 2000 later came into force on 7 May 2007. The act was later amended by the Political Parties, Elections and Referendums Act 2000 (Commencement No. 3 and Transitional Provisions) Order 2006 (which re-commenced the change to election law), and the Secretary of State for Constitutional Affairs Order 2003.

See also
List of Acts of the Parliament of the United Kingdom, 2000–2019

References

United Kingdom Acts of Parliament 2001
Election law in the United Kingdom
2001 in British law